In biology, the caiman is a reptile in the subfamily Caimaninae. 

Caiman (genus), a more restrictive sense for the genus within the Caimaninae

Caiman may also refer to:
, a US Navy submarine that served in World War II and beyond
BAE Caiman, an armored vehicle used by the US military
The Caiman (in Italian Il caimano), a 2006 Italian comedy-drama film directed by Nanni Moretti
Le Caïman, an award-winning play by French dramatist and novelist Antoine Rault
The Caïmans, a trio of bullies in the Belgian comics series La Ribambelle
Efraín Sánchez (1926–2020), Colombian former football goalkeeper nicknamed "El Caimán"
Caimans, the athletics teams of Hostos Community College, New York City, New York

See also
Caiman Marine, a French version of the NHIndustries NH90 military helicopter
Los Caimanes, a Peruvian football club
Caimanes de Barranquilla, a Colombian Professional Baseball League team based in Barranquilla
FS Class E.656, an Italian electric locomotive nicknamed "Caimano" (Caiman)
Cayman (disambiguation)